Barra Lighthouse is a lighthouse in southeastern Mozambique. The lighthouse stands on the Indian Ocean coast, at Barra Beach on the Ponta da Barra peninsula in Inhambane Province, 25 km drive from Inhambane city. The beach is a major Mozambican tourist destination. Snorkeling is popular below the lighthouse at low tide where there is a natural tidal pool. The Barra and Tofo area is one of the global hotspots for divers to see whale sharks, sea turtles and manta rays.

References

Lighthouses in Mozambique
Lighthouses completed in 1900
Buildings and structures in Inhambane Province